The Very Best of Daryl Hall & John Oates is a 2001 compilation album by the duo Hall & Oates. It reached number 34 on the Billboard 200 and #1 on the Top Pop Catalog Albums Chart. Assembled from the duo's years with RCA Records (1975–1984), the compilation features the full-length album versions of most songs rather than their edited single versions.

It was released on K2 High Definition CD in 2012 and was re-released on vinyl on August 12, 2016.

Track listing

Chart performance 
According to the Billboard web page the compilation entered twice on the Catalog Albums Chart, the first time peaking at number 43 on January 22, 2011 and the second reaching number one again on May 2, 2015.

In 2012, after Amazon reduced the price of the compilation, the album earned 758% sales increase with 10,000 copies sold and re-entered on the Billboard 200 and Digital Albums charts at numbers 34 and 14, respectively on the week of June 23, 2012, that makes it the highest-charting album on the Billboard 200 for the duo and first top 40 set since 1988 when Ooh Yeah! peaked at No. 24.

When it was released on vinyl in 2016 it re-entered on the Billboard 200, Top Pop Catalog Albums and Vinyl Albums charts at numbers 124, 10 and 16, respectively.

It was certified Platinum by the RIAA on August 28, 2015, denoting shipments of one million.

Credits
 Audio Restoration – Bill Lacey
 Compilation Producer – Paul Williams (14)
 Co-producer – Bob Clearmountain (tracks: 14, 15), Neil Kernon (tracks: 8, 10, 11, 12, 13)
 Digital Transfers – Mike Hartry
 Mixed By – Hugh Padgham (tracks: 11 to 13)
 Producer – Bob Clearmountain (tracks: 16 to 18),Christopher Bond (tracks: 1, 2), Daryl Hall (tracks: 1, 4 to 18), David Foster (tracks: 3), John Oates (tracks: 1, 5 to 18)
 Project Manager: Victoria Sarro

Charts and certifications

Weekly charts

Year-end charts

Certifications

References

2001 greatest hits albums
Hall & Oates compilation albums
RCA Records compilation albums